Clara Thomas is an American politician serving as a member of the Nevada Assembly from the 17th district. Thomas was elected to the Nevada Assembly in November 2020.

Thomas was born in Tifton, Georgia and previously served in the United States Air Force.

References

1954 births
Living people
University of Nevada, Las Vegas alumni
Democratic Party members of the Nevada Assembly
21st-century American politicians
21st-century American women politicians